The 1894 Idaho gubernatorial election was held on November 6, 1894. Incumbent Republican William J. McConnell defeated People's Party nominee James W. Ballantine with 41.51% of the vote.

General election

Candidates
Major party candidates
Edward A. Stevenson, Democratic
William J. McConnell, Republican 

Other candidates
James W. Ballantine, People's
Mary C. Johnson, Prohibition

Results

References

1894
Idaho
Gubernatorial